L. concinna may refer to:

 Lasia concinna, a flowering plant
 Lasiodothiorella concinna, a sac fungus
 Lecithocera concinna, a long-horned moth
 Leiopleura concinna, a jewel beetle
 Leiostyla concinna, a land snail
 Livistona concinna, a fan palm